Citizens for Foreign Aid Reform (C-FAR) is one of a number of groups run by neo-Nazi and white supremacist Paul Fromm. It was founded in 1976 by Fromm after he had left the white supremacist Western Guard organization. C-FAR became closely linked to Canadian Association for Free Expression (CAFE), another one of Fromm's groups, which he founded in 1981.  The main issue on C-FAR's agenda has been the promotion of an ultra-right wing agenda that is opposed to foreign aid and immigration.

In 1987, the Toronto Star newspaper described C-FAR as part of a "spider web" of ultra-right wing activists. Apart from foreign aid and immigration, C-FAR's publications also support white supremacy, gun rights, and environmentalism.

It appears that the activities of C-FAR have decreased after Fromm was fired from his position with the Peel Board of Education as a result of his involvement in racist activities.

References
Stanley Barrett: Is God a Racist? The Right Wing in Canada. (Toronto: University of Toronto Press, 1987)
Olivia Ward: "Rightist radicals weave 'spider web' in Canada, Toronto Star, Mar 29, 1987
Paul Fromm: "Group wants cuts in foreign aid spending", Toronto Star, Apr 23, 1987
"Fromm ruling raises bar for teachers", Toronto Star, Apr 09, 2002.

External links
Monday Magazine (Victoria, B.C.):How Hate Spreads A five-part series on C-FAR from 1993.
Nazis In Suits: Paul Fromm & The Far Right 
The New Generation of Organised Racialism in Canada
Citizens for Foreign Aid Reform – Canadian Political Parties and Political Interest Groups – Web Archive created by the University of Toronto Libraries

Canadian far-right political movements
Neo-Nazism in Canada
Neo-Nazi organizations